Olethreutes orthocosma is a moth of the family Tortricidae. It is found in China, Korea, Japan, Taiwan and the Russian Far East.

The wingspan is 13.0–15.5 mm.

The larvae are probably omnivorous.

References

Moths described in 1931
Olethreutini
Moths of Japan